Renatiella is a genus of diurnal, herbivorous beetles, which is found from East to southern Africa.

Species
The species include:
 Renatiella fettingi (Gebien) – Namibia to southwestern Angola
 Renatiella gebieni Koch, 1948
 Renatiella macradesmioides Koch, 1948
 Renatiella neumanni Kuntzen, 1915
 Renatiella regneri Kuntzen, 1915
 Renatiella reticulata (Gerstäcker, 1854) – Tanzania to South Africa
 Renatiella reticulata subsp. rukwana (Kuntzen)
 Renatiella scrobipennis Haag-Rutenberg, 1875 – Namibian near-endemic
 Renatiella tuberculipennis Haag, 1875

References

Beetles of Africa
Pimeliinae
Tenebrionidae genera